The Northern Natural Gas Building, also known as the 2223 Dodge Street Building, is located at 2223 Dodge Street in the Park East neighborhood of Downtown Omaha, Nebraska, United States. As of 2013, the building is Home to an apartment complex called the Highline. The building is currently listed on the National Register of Historic Places located in Douglas County, Nebraska.

History
Northern Natural Gas Co. built the six-story corporate headquarter tower in the early 1950s, adding a 16-story tower in the late 1950s.

In 1985, Northern's parent company, InterNorth Inc., bought Houston Natural Gas, a Houston, Texas-based company to become Enron Corp. Enron Corp. then became headquartered in Omaha, Nebraska for a short time.  The next year, Enron moved the company's headquarters to Houston, Texas and as one of the major corporate employers in Omaha, placed 19 office buildings in the area for sale.

The building served for a number of years as the regional headquarters of Enron's Northern Natural Gas Division until 1988, when Enron sold the building for $11.52 million to an investment group controlled by investor Michael Cutler. Northwestern National Life Insurance Company was a major initial investment partner and lender in the transaction. Northwestern National Life Insurance changed its name in 1996 to ReliaStar, and in May 2000 was acquired by Dutch financial services giant ING Group for US$5 billion.

Under Cutler's control and leadership, the building underwent a multimillion-dollar renovation and retrofit while occupied, turning it into one of Omaha's premier office, business, and technology centers. Cutler owned the building for 12 years and sold it in 2001.  The building at the time was Omaha's third-highest office structure.  With its large windows, panoramic views of the region, and central location, it was 100 percent leased throughout his ownership period.

Other major financial institutions over the years involved in the transaction while under Cutler's ownership, were First National Bank of Omaha, Security Pacific National Bank of Los Angeles, California, Bank of America, Whitehall Street Real Estate Funds(Goldman Sachs), and Acceptance Insurance Cos.

Major tenants over the years were some offices of First National Bank of Nebraska, currently the largest privately owned bank in the United States, along with the credit card and processing divisions of subsidiary First National Bank of Omaha, occupied the building until the new First National Bank Tower opened in 2002. At the time the building was considered one of the leading office, business, and technology centers in the country with state-of-the-art fiber optic communication capacity.

See also
Economy of Omaha, Nebraska
List of tallest buildings in Omaha, Nebraska

References

Skyscraper office buildings in Omaha, Nebraska
National Register of Historic Places in Omaha, Nebraska
Commercial buildings on the National Register of Historic Places in Nebraska
1950s architecture
1950s establishments in Nebraska